Mansour Jafari Mamaghani (born 28 July 1971), better known as Mansour, is an Iranian Azerbaijani musical artist specializing in Iranian traditional music based in Southern California.

Iran's Green Movement and Nokia Club controversy 2009 

After the Iranian presidential election in June 2009 and protests against its results, Mansour recorded a song titled "Nedaye Eshgh". The word "Neda" in the title of this song was used as a symbolic meaning of "calling" for freedom and hope, and also it was the first name of one of the assassinated people in these protests: Neda Agha-Soltan. Mansour also participated in some of the protests that were held in Los Angeles, California.

Despite his involvement in these causes, when Mansour began promotions for his concert at Club Nokia in Los Angeles on 26 September 2009, many people criticized his decision to perform at a place with the name of the Nokia Company, which had sold monitoring technology devices to Iran's government after protests against election outcomes. Mansour reacted against this criticism, saying, "Nokia Club is owned by AEG Company and had nothing to do with Nokia" and "the people who started these rumors should respect these holy activities [protests] in Iran and stop playing games with people's emotions." Despite this comments, Club Nokia is actually owned by both AEG and Nokia, but the planning for the concert was done months before the Iran's Green Movements and Nokia's part against the protesters. Nokia was not the sponsor of Mansour's concert; the program was presented by Century Records and Goldenvoice Company.

Discography

Studio albums 

With Taraneh Records
1996: Tasvir Akhar
1997: Daricheh 
2001: Zendegi (Life)
2002: Divooneh (Crazy)
2005: Farari (Fugitive)
2007: Ghashangeh (Beautiful)

With Caltex Records
1994: Ferferehayeh Bibaad
1998: Ghayegh Kaghazi
2000: Faghat Bekhatareh To (Only For You)

With Century Records USA
2009: Janjaali

With Avang Music
2013: No Limit

With SOHO Entertainment
2017: Radical
2019: Ensane Nou
Singles

2009: Nedaye Eshgh
2010: Mikhaam Bahat Beraghsam
2010: Zendegi Chist
2011: Bari Bakh
2011: Beshkan
2012: Eshgh Nemikhabeh
2012: Man Bahat Jooram
2013: Naz Maka
2013: Delam Khoshe
2017: Khoshbakhti
2017: Delshooreha
2017: Ay Eshgham

Live albums 

With MZM Records
1996: Mansour Live in Concert
2010: Mansour Live in Concert Club Nokia (Audio CD)

DVDs/music videos 

2001: Life ... On The Road DVD (music videos Of "Zendegi" album)
2005: Farari DVD (music videos Of "Divooneh" and some music videos from "Farari", include In "Farari" Album Package)
2007: Only For You DVD (music videos of "Faghat Be Khatereh To" album)
2010: Mansour Live in Concert Club Nokia DVD (includes videos of songs performed at club nokia concert)

Guest appearances 

 Black Cats (Featuring Mansour) – Gole Yakh (remake of Persian famous song with the same name, the original singer Is Kourosh Yaghmaei).
 Mahasti and Hayedeh (Featuring Mansour) – Vedaa (Shab-e Eshgh) (remake of song by Hayedeh and her sister Mahasti. She sings this song in the memory of her late sister, after her death. In this song Mansour just sang in the choruses, Mansour's part in original song was performed by Persian pop legend Ebi).

Filmography 

2001: America So Beautiful

References

External links 
 

1971 births
Living people
Iranian composers
People from Tehran
Iranian pop singers
Singers from Tehran
Iranian Azerbaijanis
Iranian male singers
Iranian pop musicians
Caltex Records artists
Taraneh Records artists
Persian-language singers
Kurdish-language singers
Azerbaijani-language singers
20th-century Iranian male singers
Iranian emigrants to the United States